The Ilo Province is one of three provinces that make up the Moquegua Region in Peru. The province is the largest mining center in all of the southern Peru area.

Geography 

The province borders the Mariscal Nieto Province to the north, the Jorge Basadre Province to the east and southeast, the Pacific Ocean to the south and west, and the Islay Province to the northwest.

It extends north–south through the region's coastal area, forming a bay.

Demographics

Population 

According to the 1993 Census, the Ilo Province has a population of 51,481 inhabitants, 52.4% of which (26,964) are male and 47.6% (24,517) are female.

As of 2005, the Instituto Nacional de Estadística e Informática estimates the province's population to be 68,363.

Languages 

Spanish is spoken at home by 82% of the population; while others speak Aymara (10.6%), Quechua (6.1%), other indigenous languages (0.1%) and foreign languages (0.3%).

Immigration 

Persons originating from other regions of the country make up 51.6% of the population and 0.3% of residents were born abroad.

The largest immigrant groups come from the Puno Region (17.4% of the total population) and the Arequipa Region (15.3%).

Age 

The population is spread out, with 
42.4% under the age of 20, 
10.9% from 20 to 24, 
31.2% from 25 to 44, 
12.9% from 45 to 64, and 
2.6% who are 65 years of age or older.

Political division 

The Ilo Province is divided into three districts, each of which is headed by a mayor (alcalde). The districts, with their capitals in parenthesis, are:

 El Algarrobal (El Algarrobal)
 Ilo (Ilo)
 Pacocha (Pueblo Nuevo)

See also 

 Administrative divisions of Peru

References

External links 

 Southern Copper

Provinces of the Moquegua Region